Rayid Ghani is a Distinguished Career Professor in the Machine Learning Department (in the School of Computer Science) and the Heinz College of Information Systems and Public Policy at Carnegie Mellon University. Previously, he was the Director of the Center for Data Science and Public Policy, Research Associate Professor in the Department of Computer Science, and a Senior Fellow at the Harris School of Public Policy at the  University of Chicago. He was also the co-founder of Edgeflip, an analytics startup that grew out of the Obama 2012 Campaign, focused on social media products for non-profits, advocacy groups, and charities. Recently, it was announced that he will be leaving the University of Chicago and joining Carnegie Mellon University's School of Computer Science and Heinz College of Information Systems and Public Policy.

Ghani started and runs the Eric & Wendy Schmidt Data Science for Social Good Summer Fellowship.

Education and career
Ghani completed his schooling at the Karachi Grammar School, in Karachi, Pakistan. 
Ghani completed his graduate studies in the Machine Learning Department at Carnegie Mellon University with Tom M. Mitchell on Machine Learning and Text Classification and received his undergraduate degrees in Computer Science and Mathematics from University of the South.

Before his role at the University of Chicago, he was the Chief Scientist of the Obama 2012 Campaign. Before that, he was a Senior Research Scientist and Director of Analytics research at Accenture Labs where he led a technology research team focused on applied R&D in analytics, machine learning, and data mining for large-scale and emerging business problems.

Research Contributions 

Ghani's research focuses on developing and applying machine learning, data science, and artificial intelligence methods to large scale social problems in areas such as education, healthcare, economic development, criminal justice, energy, transportation, and public safety. His work has previously focused on text analytics, fundraising, volunteer, and voter mobilization using analytics, social media, and machine learning., and data mining. Rayid's research contributions have been in the areas of text mining, co-training, active learning, consumer behavior modeling, and fraud detection.

He has given keynote speeches on Analytics and the Presidential Elections (for example at Predictive Analytics World, Digital Leaders Forum, Carnegie Mellon University, and CeBIT Australia), on Business Applications of Data Mining, and Data Science for Social Good.

Selected publications 
 Big Data and Social Science: A Practical Guide to Methods and Tools. Editors: Ian Foster, Rayid Ghani, Ron Jarmin, Frauke Kreuter, Julia Lane. CRC Press 2016.
 Data Mining for Business Applications. Editors: Carlos Soares, Rayid Ghani. Book. IOS Press 2010.
 Mining the Web to Add Semantics to Retail Data Mining. R. Ghani. Invited Paper. Web Mining: From Web to Semantic Web. Springer Lecture Notes in Artificial Intelligence, Vol. 3209. Berendt, B.; Hotho, A.; Mladenic, D.; van Someren, M.; Spiliopoulou, M.; Stumme, G. (Eds.)  2004

References

External links 

Living people
American computer scientists
Carnegie Mellon University alumni
Carnegie Mellon University faculty
Artificial intelligence researchers
Machine learning researchers
Barack Obama 2012 presidential campaign
University of Chicago faculty
1977 births
Karachi Grammar School alumni
Pakistani emigrants to the United States